Croatia participated in the 2018 FIFA World Cup. This was their fifth appearance. Croatia managed to reach the final where they lost to France and finished second in the tournament.

Qualifying 

Croatia was in Group I of UEFA's World Cup qualifications. They played alongside Iceland, Ukraine, Turkey, Finland and Kosovo. Croatia finished as runner-up in the group and entered the second-round play-offs where the team beat Greece and qualified for the 2018 FIFA World Cup.

Croatia national team was led by manager Ante Čačić until 7 October 2017 when he was, due to a series of bad results, replaced by Zlatko Dalić.

The results of the group stage

Standings

The results of the second-round play-off

Players 

Altogether 26 players appeared in the qualifying matches. Domagoj Vida is the only player that appeared in all 12 matches playing the full 90 minutes of all games. Mario Mandžukić was the top scorer with 5 achieved goals.
Filip Bradarić, Duje Ćaleta-Car and Dominik Livaković did not appear in any of the qualifying matches but made the final World Cup squad.

Complete list of players in the qualifying matches
{|class="wikitable sortable" style="text-align: center;"
|-
!width=50px|#
!class="unsortable" width=150px|Name
!width=50px|Games played
!width=50px|Goals
|-
| 1
| Domagoj Vida
| 12
| 1
|-
|rowspan="4"| 2
| Mario Mandžukić
| 11
| 5
|-
| Marcelo Brozović
| 11
| 2
|-
| Andrej Kramarić
| 11
| 3
|-
| Ivan Perišić
| 11
| 1
|-
|rowspan="3"| 6
| Danijel Subašić
| 10
| 0
|-
| Šime Vrsaljko
| 10
| 0
|-
| Luka Modrić
| 10
| 0
|-
|rowspan="3"| 9
| Nikola Kalinić
| 9
| 2
|-
| Milan Badelj
| 9
| 0
|-
| Josip Pivarić
| 9
| 0
|-
| 12
| Ivan Rakitić
| 8
| 1
|-
| 13
| Mateo Kovačić
| 7
| 0
|-
|rowspan="2"| 14
!  style="background-color: #ffdddd" | Matej Mitrović
| 6
| 1
|-
| Dejan Lovren
| 6
| 0
|-
| 16
!  style="background-color: #ffdddd" | Marko Rog
| 5
| 0
|-
| 17
!  style="background-color: #ffdddd" | Duje Čop
| 4
| 0
|-
|rowspan="3"| 18
| Ivan Strinić
| 3
| 0
|-
| Vedran Ćorluka
| 3
| 0
|-
!  style="background-color: #ffdddd" | Mario Pašalić
| 3
| 0
|-
|rowspan="3"| 21
| Lovre Kalinić
| 2
| 0
|-
| Tin Jedvaj
| 2
| 0
|-
| Ante Rebić
| 2
| 0
|-
|rowspan="3"| 24
| Marko Pjaca
| 1
| 0
|-
!   style="background-color: #ffdddd"  | Ivan Santini
| 1
| 0
|-
!  style="background-color: #ffdddd" | Nikola Vlašić
| 1
| 0
|-

World Cup preparation

Draw 
Croatia was drawn into Group D. Croatia's opponents in the first stage were Nigeria, Argentina and Iceland.

Squad
Coach: Zlatko Dalić

A 32-man preliminary squad was announced on 14 May 2018. The squad was reduced to 24 players on 21 May. The final squad was announced on 4 June.

Matches

Group stage

Standings

References

External links

 
Countries at the 2018 FIFA World Cup
Modern history of Croatia